The Point Prim Lighthouse  is a lighthouse on Prince Edward Island, Canada. It is located at the end of Point Prim Road, also known as Route 209.

The lighthouse itself is 18.5 metres (60.7 feet) tall when measured from its foundation to the weathervane. It is made of brick and is circular—one of only two so constructed in Canada. The other is called Fisgard Lighthouse and is located in British Columbia.

There is a keeper's cottage situated to the southeast of the tower. It measures 19.5 metres (34 feet) by 4 metres (14 feet). Due to the small size of the cottage, the keeper normally lived in it alone. In the summer, however, his family would often come and stay with him.

Keepers
There have been 13 keepers since it was lit.
John Ings (1841–1854)
Ewen McLeod (1854–1857)
Finlay McDonald (1857–1867)
Simon Murchinson (1867–1870)
Finlay MacDonald (1870–1872)
Alex John MacRae (1872–1873)
Michael McLeod (1873–1897)
Donald Gillis (1897–1909)
Alex John McRae (1909–1912)
Simon A. McLean (1912–1920)
Angus Alexander Murchison (1920–1955)
Norman Ross Gillis (1955–1956)
Manson D. Murchison (1956–1969)

Management
The Point Prim Lighthouse is owned and operated by the Point Prim Lighthouse Society, a non profit community organization run by a group of dedicated volunteers of the Point Prim area.
All admissions and sales are used solely for the maintenance and upkeep of the Lighthouse and the site.

Visitor access
Point Prim Light Station is open every day (10am-6pm) from late June to early September. The grounds are always open. Visitors can access the tower in season, by paying admission.

See also
 List of lighthouses in Prince Edward Island
 List of lighthouses in Canada

References

External links

 Point Prim Light Station
 Aids to Navigation Canadian Coast Guard

Lighthouses in Prince Edward Island
Lighthouses completed in 1845
Heritage sites in Prince Edward Island
1845 establishments in Canada
Lighthouses on the Canadian Register of Historic Places